Kotara  is a suburb of Newcastle, New South Wales, Australia, located  from Newcastle's central business district. It is split between the City of Newcastle and City of Lake Macquarie local government areas. Kotara is known as one of Newcastle's largest retail destinations and is characterised by its family centred culture.

History 
The Aboriginal people, in this area, the Awabakal, were the first people of this land.

In the late 19th century the Australasia Coal Company operated a mine near Kotara, in the valley below the present-day northern entrance to Tickhole Tunnel. A private railway connected the screens with the Government line near the present-day triangle junctions north of Broadmeadow. Surveying for the line commenced in 1875 and the line was completed in April 1877. However, only a total of 9,052 tons was ever produced and the company went into liquidation in June 1879.

It was originally designed to create a 'garden suburb' with high quality and quickly grew in population after 1947.

Population
In the 2016 Census, there were 3,929 people in Kotara. 87.4% of people were born in Australia and 90.9% of people spoke only English at home. The most common responses for religion were No Religion 33.2%, Catholic 23.7%, Anglican 18.0% and Uniting Church 5.8%.

Commercial area
Kotara is a large retail centre of Newcastle.

Westfield Kotara (previously known as Garden City and Kotara Fair) is a large shopping centre on Northcott Drive. Across the road from Westfield is the Kotara Home Centre, consisting of big box department stores and food outlets. Notable retailers include JB Hi-Fi, Dan Murphy's and Bunnings Warehouse.

Education
Kotara is home to Kotara South Public School on Rodway Parade and the local Catholic School St James Primary School, located on Vista Parade.

See also
Kotara railway station

References 

Suburbs of Newcastle, New South Wales